The 2012 gubernatorial election in the Mexican state of Jalisco was held on Sunday, July 1, 2012. Incumbent Jalisco Governor Emilio González Márquez of the National Action Party (PAN) is retiring due to mandatory term limits, which limit all Mexican state governors to one, six-year term in office. The Jalisco gubernatorial election coincided with the 2012 Mexican presidential and general elections.

Candidates

Polling
A poll conducted by El Universal in May 2012 showed PRI candidate Jorge Aristóteles Sandoval leading his three opponents in the race.

References

2012 elections in Mexico
Jalisco
Gubernatorial
Politics of Jalisco
July 2012 events in Mexico